Lebogang Phalula (born 9 December 1983) is a South African long-distance runner.

In 2009, she competed in the senior women's race at the 2009 IAAF World Cross Country Championships held in Amman, Jordan. She finished in 29th place.

In 2018, she competed in the women's half marathon at the 2018 IAAF World Half Marathon Championships held in Valencia, Spain. She finished in 97th place.

In 2011, she received a six-month ban from the sport after giving a positive test for the banned stimulant methylhexaneamine.

She won the 800 metres title at the 2005 South African Athletics Championships.

She has a twin sister who is also an athlete, the similarly named Dina Lebo Phalula.

See also
List of doping cases in athletics

References

External links 
 

1983 births
Living people
Place of birth missing (living people)
South African female cross country runners
South African female long-distance runners
South African Athletics Championships winners
Twin sportspeople
Doping cases in athletics
South African sportspeople in doping cases